Horace James (born 20 December 1984) is a Jamaican footballer who plays for New Zealand club North Shore United in the Northern League.

Career 
From Port Maria, St Mary Jamaica, Horace James played his debut professional game when he was 18 years old with Star Cosmos in the Jamaica National Premier League. Being his youth club, he joined the Star Cosmos when he was 16 years old and stayed with the side for several seasons.

St. Georges
James came back to play for St. Georges in the JPL where he stayed for a few seasons. He then moved to High Gate and Montego Bay United.

Atlanta Silverbacks
On 20 July 2012, James signed with Atlanta Silverbacks. He last played with Montego Bay United of the Red Stripe Premier League. He has previously played with Highgate United and St. George's SC. On 12 August 2012, James made his debut for Atlanta Silverbacks as a sub for Jahbari Willis in the 61'. On 26 August 2012, James made his first start with Atlanta Silverbacks in a 1–0 loss to Carolina RailHawks.

FC Edmonton
James signed with FC Edmonton in 2014.

Perak
A year later, he signed for Malaysian team Perak FA, making his debut in the league match against Terengganu FA on 11 April 2015. He contributed an assist in the game, as Perak lost 2–3 at home.

SHB Đà Nẵng
In February 2016, James joined V.League 1 side SHB Đà Nẵng.

Waitakere United
In 2017 James joined Waitakere United who play in the New Zealand Football Championship.

North Shore United
James current plays for North Shore United in the New Zealand Northern League.

References

External links 
 Atlanta Silverbacks bio
 

1984 births
Living people
Jamaican footballers
Jamaican expatriate footballers
Jamaican expatriate sportspeople in Malaysia
Atlanta Silverbacks players
FC Edmonton players
Perak F.C. players
Expatriate soccer players in the United States
Expatriate soccer players in Canada
North American Soccer League players
Montego Bay United F.C. players
People from Saint Mary Parish, Jamaica
Expatriate footballers in Malaysia
Expatriate footballers in Vietnam
Malaysia Super League players
V.League 1 players
Association football midfielders
Highgate United F.C. (Jamaica) players
North Shore United AFC players
New Zealand National League players